Camp 1391 or Unit 1391 or Facility 1391  is an Israel Defense Forces prison camp in northern Israel for "high-risk" prisoners. It is run by Unit 504. The existence of the prison was unknown to the public before 2003, and most information about it remains classified, though Israel's supreme court ordered the release of some information about the jail.

Location

Camp 1391 is situated in a Tegart fort on route 574 between kibbutz Barkai and kibbutz Ma'anit in northern Israel and less than an hour's drive from Tel Aviv.

Discovery of the location
The location of the camp was accidentally discovered by Israeli historian Gad Kroizer, who found a 70-year-old map drawn by a government architect while researching old British police buildings. On the map were 62 British police compounds in Palestine in the late 1930s and early 1940s where Arab and Jewish militants against the British occupation were interrogated. One camp, "Meretz", did not appear on any modern Israeli maps. In 2004, Kroizer published an article in an academic journal, mentioning the prison location in a footnote. Some days later, he received a phone call from Israel's military censor asking why the article had not been submitted for inspection. According to The Guardian, the facility "had been airbrushed from Israeli aerial photographs and purged from modern maps".

Operation
Camp 1391 is operated by the Israel Defense Forces Intelligence Corps, rather than by Shin Bet. 

HaMoked, a major Israeli human rights organization, has petitioned the High Court of Justice to challenge the legality of the facility.

Criticism
Dubbed "the Israeli Guantanamo", the secret was kept in such a manner as to be even unknown to David Libai, Minister of Justice in Yitzhak Rabin's government and member of the secret services related ministerial committee. According to Leah Tsemel, an Israeli lawyer who specialises in advising Palestinians, "Anyone entering the prison can be made to disappear, potentially forever, it's no different from the jails run by tinpot South American dictators."

According to accounts of former captives, the detainees were led into the facility blindfolded, and kept in cells (most are 2  m × 2 m) with no natural light. Two smaller cells (1.25 m × 1.25 m) with heavy steel doors and black or red walls, and almost no light, were used for solitary confinement. Some of the cells did not have adequate toilet facilities and the guards controlled the running water.  Mustafa Dirani, an Amal commander<ref name="metimes_holding">Middle East Times, Israel holding Hamas commander as a "bargaining chip" AFP, September 11, 2007</ref> who was captured by the Israelis in May 1994 and released in 2004 as part of a prisoner swap, has filed a suit in Tel Aviv's district court claiming he was sexually abused in the prison. It has been acknowledged by the government of Israel that "within the framework of a military police investigation the suspicion arose that an interrogator who questioned the complainant threatened to perform a sexual act on the complainant".

Inmates were not allowed visits at the facility from the Red Cross, nor were any other independent organization permitted to inspect the site.  The prisoners were not told where they were, nor were their families or lawyers. In 2003, in response to a lawsuit, Israeli government lawyers said that while the location was secret, Palestinians who were incarcerated there had their rights safeguarded, and could meet with lawyers and Red Cross at an off-site location. In May 2009, the United Nations Committee against Torture (CAT) questioned Israeli officials about the facility and expressed skepticism about this claim. The CAT stated that "Israeli security secretly detains and interrogates prisoners in an unknown location called 'Camp 1391' without granting access to the committee, the International Red Cross (ICRC), or the lawyers or relatives of the prisoners", questioned why interrogations at Camp 1391 were not recorded, and stated that "600 complaints of alleged ill-treatment or torture were brought between 2001 and 2006, but none had been followed up".

Israeli officials maintain that Camp 1391 "is no longer used since 2006 to detain or interrogate suspects", but several petitions filed to the Israeli Supreme Court by the CAT to examine the facility have been rejected. The Israeli Supreme Court also refused to allow an inquiry of the alleged abuses, declaring that Israeli authorities had acted reasonably in not conducting investigations into allegations of torture, ill-treatment and poor detention conditions of detainees. The CAT responded to this by asserting that secret detention centers are per se'' a breach of the United Nations Convention Against Torture, concluding that the state "should ensure that no one is detained in any secret detention facility under its control in the future" and that Israel "should investigate and disclose the existence of any other such facility and the authority under which it has been established. It should ensure that all allegations of torture and ill-treatment by detainees in Facility 1391 be impartially investigated, the results made public, and any perpetrators responsible for breaches of the Convention be held accountable."

See also
 Palestinian prisoners in Israel

References

Torture in Israel
Military installations of Israel
Tegart forts
Military Intelligence Directorate (Israel)
Black sites